Emperor Rui can refer to:

 Yang Pu (900-939), formally Emperor Rui of Wu (吳睿帝)
 Zhengtong Emperor (1427–1464), posthumous name Emperor Rui of Ming (睿皇帝)
 Jiaqing Emperor (1760–1820), posthumous name Emperor Rui of Qing (睿皇帝)